Criminal Investigation Police University of China (CIPUC) is a college in Shenyang, Liaoning province, China.

External links
Official Website

Universities and colleges in Liaoning
Law enforcement in China
Police academies in China